Ozius deplanatus, commonly known as the black finger crab and the iron crab, is a species of crab found in New Zealand and Australia.

Distribution 
Common around the North Island of New Zealand.

Found in Australia from Eastern Victoria to New South Wales, on Flinders Island and the Kent Group.

Also found on Lord Howe Island and Norfolk Island.

Habitat 

O. deplanatus is found under boulders and among stones in the lower to mid tidal regions of the intertidal zone on sheltered rocky and gravel shores.

It is distributed sparsely, with one individual per 5 m2.

Description 
Adults average  in size with a flattened oval-shaped carapace that is wide in the front with blunt lobed edges. This can be a rusty red to chocolate brown colour with light mottling. Underside may be a paler cream colour.  The antennae are dark red to brown. Claws are large with a smooth texture. Fingers may be black or brown in colour. Walking legs are pale red with golden setae or hairs.

Behaviour & Diet 
The black finger crab is a scavenger feeder. It feeds on snails, half-crabs and hermit crabs. It is known to chip away at the shells of larger snails before grasping the animal with its mouth-parts. Smaller snails are crushed by the crab's large claws. It also feeds on limpets and chitons by using the tip of its claw to remove them from a rock.

It will spread its claws when started or threatened.

References 

http://www.marinespecies.org/aphia.php?p=taxdetails&id=440514

https://collections.tepapa.govt.nz/object/966640

http://www.marinelife.ac.nz/species/951

Eriphioidea